Abobakr Abass Fadlallah Jalab (born 1 November 1998) is a Sudanese swimmer. He represented Sudan at the 2019 World Aquatics Championships in Gwangju, South Korea. He competed in the men's 50 metre freestyle and men's 100 metre breaststroke events.

He represented Sudan at the 2020 Summer Olympics in Tokyo, Japan. He was one of the flagbearers for Sudan during the 2020 Summer Olympics Parade of Nations as part of the opening ceremony on 23 July 2021, along with rower Esraa Khogali. He competed in the men's 100 metre breaststroke event where he did not advance to compete in the semifinals.

References

External links 
 

1998 births
Living people
Place of birth missing (living people)
Sudanese male swimmers
Sudanese male freestyle swimmers
Male breaststroke swimmers
Swimmers at the 2020 Summer Olympics
Olympic swimmers of Sudan
Swimmers at the 2015 African Games
African Games competitors for Sudan